The City of Belmont in Perth, Western Australia was originally established on 2 December 1898 as a road board with a chairman and councillors under the District Roads Act 1871. It was renamed "Belmont Park Road District" on 4 October 1907. With the passage of the Local Government Act 1960, all road districts became Shires, with a president and councillors, effective 1 July 1961. On 17 February 1979, the Shire of Belmont became a City, with a mayor and councillors.

Belmont Park Road District

Shire of Belmont

City of Belmont

References

 

Lists of local government leaders in Western Australia
City of Belmont